Victoria River Downs Station, also known as Victoria Downs and in the past sometimes referred to as The Big Run, is a pastoral lease that operates as a cattle station in the Northern Territory of Australia, established in 1883.

History

The station was originally established in 1883 on the lands of the Bilingara and Karranga peoples by Charles Fisher and Maurice Lyons, who also owned nearby Glencoe Station. The men stocked the property with 20,000 head of cattle that had been overlanded from Wilmot by Nat Buchanan. The lease had been granted by the South Australian government in December 1879 for an area of land . Fisher ran into monetary problems and following legal battles the property was awarded to Goldsbrough Mort & Co. Ltd in 1889. In early 1900 Goldsbrough sold the lease and the stock for £27,500 to a syndicate consisting of Forrest, Emmanuel & Company and the  Kidman Brothers.

The station was shipping cattle at this time to Batavia via Singapore along with other stations in the area, in 1894 the station shipped 2,205 head for which they were paid £7717.

In March 1895, Goldsbrough Mort & Co employed the notorious Jack Waston to manage the station. Watson had such a "bad name among the blacks" that the Aboriginal people used as cheap labour on the station had all run away. Even his own "blackboy" servant named Pompey had cleared out. When Watson later heard that Pompey had been killed, he asked the local mounted police constable, William Willshire to bring him Pompey's skull so he could use it as a spittoon. Willshire complied with the request and brought him the skull.

In May 1895, a group of Aboriginal people attacked a supply wagon travelling through nearby Jasper Gorge. Two colonists were seriously wounded and a significant amount of firearms and ammunition were taken. It was thought that with these weapons, a formidable local Aboriginal uprising could result. Before the police could act, Jack Watson decided to organise a punitive expedition himself, to punish those involved and also try to recover the guns. He gathered 17 armed and mounted men and in two days tracked down a large camp of Aboriginal people, fatally shooting possibly 60 people. Watson did not find any guns but he did return with three captured women. One of these women had a broken arm, another was covered in welts from being whipped and the third was lactating from her breasts but no child was with her. These women later escaped.

Watson died in the Katherine River in 1896 and his brother, Robert Molesworth Watson, took over the management of Victoria River Downs.

By 1901 the station was carrying about 30,000 head of cattle. and by 1907 Victoria River Downs was stocked with an estimated 69,350 head of cattle.

Sidney Kidman sold Victoria River Downs to Bovril Australian Estates in 1909 along with another two stations, one being Northcote and the other in Western Australia near Wyndham called Carlton Hill for a total of £200,000.

By 1923 the size of the property was estimated at  making it the largest property in the Northern Territory at the time.

William Buckland, a Melbourne businessman, purchased the property in 1955 and then sold again in 1960 to Hooker Corporation. When changes were made to the lease in 1961 the Animal Production Branch approached the Hooker Pastoral Company to excise a small portion of the lease to establish a research station. The  area was surrendered in 1963. It was named the Victoria river Research Station in 1965 but is commonly referred to as Kidman Springs. The research station commenced operations 1969. In 1984, the station was sold again, this time to Peter Sherwin for 11.6 million. Kerry Packer had sought to buy the property and had negotiated the sale agreement with Hooker but the Northern Territory government invoked its right of veto sale of large parcels of land and instead gave Sherwin approval. Packer acquired Newcastle Waters instead.

Sherwin was subject to a takeover bid by Elders in 1988 and Elders gave a 17.4% share in the property to Robert Holmes a Court, by 1989 Holmes a Court owned all of Victoria River Downs which today trades as Heytesbury Beef.

The station and surrounding areas were pounded with heavy rains in February 2010, receiving  over the course of the month. This figure was the highest monthly total ever in the 120 years that rainfall has been recorded at Victoria River Downs, and smashed the previous record set in 2004.

Location and description

The property abuts the Daguragu Aboriginal Land Trust to the south, Camfield Station, Montejinni and Killarney Stations to the east, Delamere to the north and Humbert River Station and the Bilinarra-Jutpurra Aboriginal Land Trust to the west. The Auvergne and Wave Hills Stock routes both pass through the station as does the Buntine Highway that passes through the south east corner.

Victoria River Downs Station has in the past been referred to as The Big Run.

Its name derives from the Victoria River, a major river system and floodplain. Several watercourses (mainly tributaries of the Victoria) pass through the property, including the Wickham River, Camfield River, Townsend River, Humbert River, Gill Creek, Blackskin Creek, Depot Creek, Jasper Creek and Battle Creek.

The property is composed of several land types including ridges and plateaus on sandstone or dolomite, gently undulating plains of dolomite overlaid with loamy soils, limestone outcrops and alluvial floodplains with cracking clays. Vegetation includes wire grass, white grass and black spear grass on the red earth country with stands of ribbon grass, flinders grass, blue grass and feathertop wire grass on the clay country.

The station was  owned by Heytesbury Pty. Ltd. The eastern boundary of Victoria River Downs adjoins Killarney Station, Killarney was excised from Victoria Downs when the station exceeded  in size. The much smaller  Humbert River station is on the western boundary.

The station is served by the Victoria River Downs Airport.

Outstations

Camfield Station
Camfield Station was also once an outstation of Victoria Downs, now owned by the Australian Agricultural Company.

Pigeon Hole

Pigeon Hole Station was until 2000 an outstation of Victoria River Downs. Pigeon Hole is  an Aboriginal settlement, inhabited by Gurindji and Ngarinyman people.

In late February to early March 2023, heavy rains fell over the area. The upper Victoria River exceeded major flood levels at Kalkarindji, and evacuations were ordered for residents of Daguragu, Kalkarindji, Pigeon Hole, and Palumpa. First, Daguaragu and Pigeon Hole were fully evacuated to Kalkarindji, whence two aeroplanes of the Australian Defence Force carried evacuees out of Kalkarindji to Katherine. They then travelled by bus to Darwin, to be accommodated at the Centre of National Resilience in Howard Springs.

See also
 List of ranches and stations
 List of the largest stations in Australia

References

Stations (Australian agriculture)
Pastoral leases in the Northern Territory
1880 establishments in Australia